Three male athletes from Burkina Faso competed at the 1996 Summer Paralympics in Atlanta, United States.

Team 
There were 0 female and 3 male athletes representing the country at the 1996 Summer Paralympics.  Their participation numbers for Atlanta were one of their highest along with Barcelona.  The following cycle, they sent 1 athlete.  The country would be absent entirely from the 2004 Games in Athens.

See also
Burkina Faso at the Paralympics
Burkina Faso at the 1996 Summer Olympics

References 

Nations at the 1996 Summer Paralympics
1996
Summer Paralympics